Fort Nightly is the debut studio album by American indie rock band White Rabbits. It was released May 22, 2007 on Say Hey Records.

Track listing
 "Kid on My Shoulders" – 4:36
 "The Plot" – 3:33
 "Dinner Party" – 3:48
 "Navy Wives" – 4:24
 "While We Go Dancing" – 4:19
 "I Used to Complain Now I Don't" – 3:39
 "Take a Walk Around the Table" – 3:46
 "March of the Camels" – 4:31
 "Fort Nightly" – 3:58
 "Reprise" – 0:48
 "Tourist Trap" – 4:11

References

2007 debut albums
White Rabbits (band) albums